Mike Hann defeated Jan-Erik Lundqvist in the final, 6–0, 11–9 to win the boys' singles tennis title at the 1955 Wimbledon Championships.

Draw

Draw

References

External links

Boys' Singles
Wimbledon Championship by year – Boys' singles